Administration Building, Indiana Central University, also known as Good Hall, is a historic building located at the University of Indianapolis, Indianapolis, Indiana (originally called Indiana Central University).  It was built in 1904, and is a -story, Classical Revival style red-brick building.  It measures approximately 127 feet by 150 feet and features a colossal two-story portico supported by Ionic order columns.  It has two-story flanking wings and a porte cochere.

It was listed on the National Register of Historic Places in 1984.

References

University and college buildings on the National Register of Historic Places in Indiana
Neoclassical architecture in Indiana
University and college buildings completed in 1904
Buildings and structures in Indianapolis
National Register of Historic Places in Indianapolis
University and college administration buildings in the United States
University of Indianapolis
1904 establishments in Indiana